Gary Lewis & the Playboys were a 1960s era pop and rock group, fronted by musician Gary Lewis, the son of comedian Jerry Lewis. They are best known for their 1965 Billboard Hot 100 number-one single "This Diamond Ring", which was the first of a string of hit singles they had in 1965 and 1966. The band had an earnest, boy-next-door image similar to British invasion contemporaries such as Herman's Hermits and Gerry and the Pacemakers. The group folded in 1970, but a version of the band later resumed touring and continues to tour, often playing for veterans' benefits.

1960s fame
The group began life as Gary & the Playboys. Gary Lewis started the band with four friends of his when he was 18. Joking at the lateness of his bandmates to practice, Lewis referred to them as "playboys", and the name stuck.

They auditioned for a job at Disneyland without telling Disneyland employees about Lewis' celebrity father. They were hired on the spot, audiences at Disneyland quickly accepted them, and the Playboys were soon playing to a full house every night.

The orchestra bandleader Les Brown, who had known Jerry Lewis for years, had told record producer Snuff Garrett that the younger Lewis was playing at Disneyland. After listening to the band, Garrett thought using Gary's famous name might sell more records, and convinced them to add "Lewis" into their name.

Garrett brought them to a recording studio with the song "This Diamond Ring" in a session financed by Jerry Lewis' wife Patti. In a 2012 interview, Lewis confirmed that he and the Playboys "played on every single track we ever did", including this song. Garrett wanted to maximize the chances for a hit, so he insisted on using experienced session musicians for the overdubs, which included guitar and keyboard solos, additional bass and drum overdubs, and timpani.

These musicians included Mike Deasy and Tommy Allsup on guitars, Leon Russell on keyboards, Joe Osborn on bass, and Hal Blaine on drums, members of the larger group known as The Wrecking Crew. Session singer Ron Hicklin did the basic vocal track. Garrett then added Lewis's voice twice, added some of the Playboys and more of Hicklin. "When I got through, he sounded like Mario Lanza", Garrett commented.

Garrett got airplay in New York City for "This Diamond Ring" by making a deal with WINS disc jockey "Murray the K" Kaufman, who ran a series of all-star concerts at theaters around the New York area. Garrett promised that if Kaufman played Lewis’ record, the Playboys would do his shows. Garrett then had Jerry Lewis use his contacts to get his son onto The Ed Sullivan Show.

However, Sullivan had a general policy that all acts appearing on his show were to perform live. Since so many studio tricks had been used on the record, the Playboys could not recreate its sound. In compromise, Lewis sang along with pre-recorded tracks as the Playboys pretended to play their instruments.

The January 1965 broadcast made Gary Lewis and the Playboys instant stars. "This Diamond Ring" went to No. 1, sold over 1 million copies by April 1965, and became a gold disc. However, by the end of 1965 only West and Lewis remained in the band. Other later band members included Tommy Tripplehorn, father of actress Jeanne Tripplehorn; Carl Radle (died 1980); Jimmy Karstein; Randy Ruff; Pete Vrains; Bob Simpson; Adolph Zeugner; Les John; Wayne Bruno; and Dave Gonzalez.

The group was one of only two acts during the 1960s whose first seven releases on the Billboard Hot 100 reached that chart's top 10 (The Lovin' Spoonful was the other). The singles were "This Diamond Ring" (No. 1), "Count Me In" (the only non-British Commonwealth record in the Hot 100's Top 10 on May 8, 1965, at No. 2), "Save Your Heart for Me" (No. 2), "Everybody Loves a Clown" (No. 4), "She's Just My Style" (No. 3), "Sure Gonna Miss Her" (No. 9), and "Green Grass" (No. 8).  Lewis was drafted into the U.S. Army in January 1967, with previously made recordings continuing to reach the Hot 100, but with decreasing success.

On his 1968 discharge, Lewis immediately returned to recording, reaching the top 40 one last time with a top 20 remake of Brian Hyland's "Sealed With A Kiss", but unable to regain his group's earlier momentum.  Lewis continued touring, eventually marketing the band as a nostalgia act.  He also appeared and performed on many of his father's Labor Day telethons for the Muscular Dystrophy Association.

In all, Lewis had eight gold singles, 12 Top 40 hit singles (but only 15 Hot 100 entries (U.S.)), and four gold albums.  In addition to The Ed Sullivan Show, he appeared on American Bandstand, Shindig!, Hullabaloo, The Sally Jessy Raphaël show, The Tonight Show Starring Johnny Carson, The Mike Douglas Show, Nashville Now and Wolfman Jack.

Despite the group's U.S. success, they made virtually no impact at all in the U.K.; their only UK Singles Chart appearance occurred in 1975, when a reissue of 1966's "My Heart's Symphony" peaked at No. 36.  Nevertheless, at a time when British groups were dominating the American music scene, Gary Lewis & the Playboys were one of the few successful 1960s homegrown groups.

Original members
 Gary Lewis - drums and vocals (born Gary Harold Lee Levitch, July 31, 1945, Newark, New Jersey)
 David Walker - rhythm guitar (b. May 12, 1943, Montgomery, Alabama)
 Allan Ramsay - bass (July 27, 1943 – November 27, 1985; aged 42)
 David Costell - lead guitar (born March 15, 1944, Pittsburgh, Pennsylvania)
 John West - organ and Cordovox (electronic accordion) (born July 31, 1939, Uhrichsville, Ohio)

Discography

Singles

Albums

Compilation albums

References

External links
 Official website

American pop rock music groups
Liberty Records artists
Musical groups established in 1964
Musical groups disestablished in 1970
Musical quintets